Ro-36 was an Imperial Japanese Navy Kaichū type submarine of the K6 sub-class. Completed and commissioned in May 1943, she served in World War II, conducting four war patrols in the Pacific Ocean before she was sunk in June 1944.

Design and description
The submarines of the K6 sub-class were versions of the preceding K5 sub-class with greater range and diving depth. They displaced  surfaced and  submerged.

For surface running, the boats were powered by two  diesel engines, each driving one propeller shaft. When submerged each propeller was driven by a  electric motor. They could reach  on the surface and  underwater.

The boats were armed with four internal bow  torpedo tubes and carried a total of ten torpedoes. They were also armed with a single  L/40 anti-aircraft gun and two single  AA guns.

Construction and commissioning

Ro-36 was laid down as Submarine No. 202 on 7 March 1942 by Mitsubishi at Kobe, Japan. She was renamed Ro-36 on 25 September 1942, and was provisionally attached to the Maizuru Naval District that day. She was launched on 14 October 1942 and completed and commissioned on 27 May 1943.

Service history

Upon commissioning, Ro-36 was attached formally to the Maizuru Naval District, and on 31 May 1943 she was assigned to Submarine Squadron 11 for workups. On 20 August 1943 she was reassigned directly to 6th Fleet headquarters, and she departed Maizuru bound for Truk on 5 September 1943.

First war patrol 
Ro-36 got underway from Truk on 24 September 1943 to begin her first war patrol, assigned a patrol area in the New Hebrides. Off the New Hebrides on 13 October 1943, she attacked a lone Allied merchant ship but scored no hits, and the ship escaped. That same day, 40 members of her crew became ill with food poisoning, so she received orders on 14 October 1943 to return to Truk, which she reached on 21 October 1943. While at Truk, she was reassigned to Submarine Division 34 on 31 October 1943.

Second war patrol

During early December 1943, Ro-36 took aboard torpedoes and supplies from the auxiliary submarine tender  at Truk, and on 8 December 1943 she put to sea for her second war patrol with orders to conduct a reconnaissance of Espiritu Santo in the New Hebrides. The patrol was uneventful, and after a month at sea she returned to Truk on 8 January 1944.

Operation Hailstone
During Ro-36′s stay at Truk, United States Navy Task Force 58 conducted Operation Hailstone, a major attack on Truk by carrier aircraft supported by anti-shipping sweeps around the atoll by surface warships, on 17 and 18 February 1944. Ro-36 and the submarines  and  put to sea on 17 February in an attempt to intercept the attacking ships. Ro-36 was unsuccessful, and returned to Truk on 19 February 1944.

Third war patrol
After again receiving torpedoes and stores from Heian Maru, Ro-36 got underway from Truk to begin her third war patrol on 25 February 1944, assigned a patrol area in the Marshall Islands. On 1 March 1944, she received orders to conduct a reconnaissance of Roi in the northern portion of Kwajalein Atoll. She surfaced off Roi on 4 March 1944, but did not make contact with any Allied forces. She embarked the coastwatchers at Pingelap on 23 March 1944 and set course for Truk, which she reached on 28 March 1944.

April–June 1944

On 15 April 1944, Ro-36 departed Truk bound for Maizuru, where she arrived on 26 April 1944 to undergo an overhaul. After its completion, she got underway from Maizuru on 4 June 1944, stopped at Saeki, and then headed for Saipan in the Mariana Islands.

Fourth war patrol

Ro-36 departed Saipan on 11 June 1944 to make a supply run to Wewak, New Guinea, to support Japanese forces fighting in the New Guinea campaign, and conduct her fourth war patrol in the waters north of New Guinea. On 13 June 1944, however, the commander-in-chief of the Combined Fleet, Admiral Soemu Toyoda, activated Operation A-Go for the defense of the Mariana Islands and ordered the commander-in-chief of the 6th Fleet, Vice Admiral Takeo Takagi, to redeploy all 6th Fleet submarines to the Marianas. Takagi, in turn, ordered all available submarines to deploy east of the Marianas. That day, Ro-36 and the submarine  were reassigned to Submarine Squadron 7 and ordered to move to the Saipan area, and Ro-36 sent a routine situation and weather report to the commander of Submarine Squadron 7. The Japanese never heard from her again.

Loss
Melvin opened fire on the submarine with her  guns.

The submarine Melvin sank probably was Ro-36. On 12 July 1944, the Imperial Japanese Navy declared her to be presumed lost north of New Guinea with all 77 hands. She was stricken from the Navy list on 10 August 1944.

Notes

References
 

 

Ro-35-class submarines
Kaichū type submarines
Ships built by Mitsubishi Heavy Industries
1942 ships
World War II submarines of Japan
Japanese submarines lost during World War II
World War II shipwrecks in the Pacific Ocean
Maritime incidents in June 1944
Submarines sunk by United States warships
Ships lost with all hands